Corktown is a neighborhood located in Detroit, Michigan. It is the oldest extant neighborhood in the city.  The current boundaries of the district include I-75 to the north, the Lodge Freeway to the east, Bagley and Porter streets to the south, and Rosa Parks Boulevard (12th Street) to the west. The neighborhood was listed on the National Register of Historic Places in 1978.

The Corktown Historic District is largely residential, although some commercial properties along Michigan Avenue are included in the district. The residential section is listed on the National Register of Historic Places and is designated as a City of Detroit Historic District. The neighborhood contains many newer homes and retains some original Irish businesses.

History
The Great Famine of Ireland of the 1840s resulted in extensive Irish migration to the United States and Canada. By the middle of the 19th century, they were the largest ethnic group settling in Detroit.  Many of these newcomers settled on the west side of the city; they were primarily from County Cork, and thus the neighborhood came to be known as Corktown. By the early 1850s, half of the population of the 8th Ward (which contained Corktown) were of Irish descent.  Historically, the neighborhood was roughly bounded by Third Street to the east, Grand River Avenue to the north, 12th Street to the west, and Jefferson Avenue/Detroit River to the south.

By the Civil War, German immigrants had begun making inroads into the Corktown neighborhood.  Many immigrants had come from German provinces after the revolutions of 1848. By the turn of the century, the original Irish population had diffused through the city, and new immigrants, notably Mexican and Maltese, moved into this older housing.  As the century progressed, migrants from the American South and Appalachia, both black and white, were lured by the jobs in the automobile industry and also went to the city.  By the middle of the 20th century, the area of Corktown was reduced through urban renewal schemes, the building of light industrial facilities, and the creation of the Lodge Freeway and Fisher Freeway.

Revitalization

Corktown has seen a number of revitalization projects since 2005. These include the United Irish Societies Irish Plaza, dedicated in 2006; the 66,000-square foot (6,100 m2) Quicken Loans Technology Center, opened in 2015; and the Detroit Police Athletic League (PAL) headquarters, and youth sports facility at the old Tiger Stadium site at Michigan and Trumbull Avenues, developed in 2016. Opposite the PAL facility, a $37-million mixed-use development, The Corner, with 111 apartments, and 34 townhomes for sale, broke ground in early 2018. Also in 2016, the new Trumbull & Porter boutique hotel opened after a $10 million renovation; and in 2017, Soave Enterprises broke ground on Elton Park, a multi-phase, multi-year $150 million, 420 apartment mixed-used development.

Ford Corktown Campus

A major redevelopment push in the area was started by the Ford Motor Company, which began development on an urban campus in Corktown in 2017 with its purchase, renovation and occupation of The Factory building at Michigan Ave. and Rosa Parks Blvd. Ford later bought other parcels of land in Corktown, including the Michigan Central Station and the adjacent Roosevelt Warehouse. Ford plans a new $740 million Corktown campus, including 1.2 million square feet of mixed-use development spread over the Michigan Central Station, Roosevelt Warehouse, the Factory building at 1907 Michigan Avenue, and build a new mixed-use 290,000-square foot (27,000 m2), four-story building on the vacant brass factory building site, known as "The Alchemy", at 2051 Rosa Park Blvd. Ford also announced plans to build two new parking structures. 

The focus of the Corktown campus will be on autonomous vehicles and electric vehicles. Ford expects to move 2,500 of its employees to the campus with space for an additional 2,500 entrepreneurs, technology companies and partners related to Ford's expansion into Autos 2.0. Ford is also seeking $104 million in tax breaks from the city as part of a $250 million incentive package over 34 years.

In 2020, Ford revealed a new site plan for its 30-acre Corktown Campus, a walkable Mobility Innovation District built around the Michigan Central Station that includes green spaces, new buildings, and community involvement.

Architecture 
The original buildings in Corktown are Federal-style detached homes and rowhouses built by Irish settlers.  A worker's row house circa 1840 is located on Sixth Street and is one of the oldest existing structures in the city of Detroit. In later years, modestly sized Victorian townhouses with Italianate, Gothic, and Queen Anne elements were constructed in the district.

Education

Residents are zoned to Detroit Public Schools. Residents are zoned to Owen at Pelham and King High School.

The Roman Catholic Archdiocese of Detroit operates the Most Holy Trinity School in Corktown. It is one of the four remaining Catholic grade schools in the city.

Notable resident

 Sheila Cockrel, former Detroit City Council member

See also
 North Corktown
 New Center
 Midtown
 Mexicantown

References

External links 

Corktown Detroit, Walter P. Reuther Library, Wayne University,  Article detailing the history of Corktown and related material
"$148M Lightweight Materials Institute Opens in Corktown"—DBusiness, 16 January 2015 
"National Innovation Institute Heading to Detroit’s Corktown"— DBusiness, 21 May 2014
Information about the Irish Community in greater Detroit, DetroitIrish.org 
Detroit1701
Corktown Historic District, City of Detroit

Appalachian culture in Michigan
 
Maltese American
Neighborhoods in Detroit
Irish-American culture in Michigan
Irish-American neighborhoods
National Register of Historic Places in Detroit
Historic districts on the National Register of Historic Places in Michigan